Histiona is a genus of Excavata.

It is a jakobid.

References 

Excavata genera
Jakobids